Lorenza Ponce is an American violinist and string arranger. She has recorded six albums of her own music and has collaborated with other musicians, most notably as a touring musician with Sheryl Crow, The Dixie Chicks, Kitaro, Ben Folds Five, Hall and Oates, Bon Jovi and a member of the Jon Bon Jovi (solo) acoustic group.

Notable Live Performance Collaborations

Recording/String Arranger 
Bon Jovi  Burning Bridges “Blind Love” – string arrangement/violin/viola/cello
Carly Simon “You Don’t Know Hurt” (on Listen: Our Time Theater Company – various artists) – string arrangement/violin
Megan McCauley Better Than Blood – string arrangement/contractor/conductor
The Cringe  Tipping Point – string arrangements/contractor/conductor
Bon Jovi MTV Unplugged – string arrangement (“Livin’ On A Prayer”), violin/vocals/viola/string contractor
Dixie Chicks Mary Had A Little Amp “Rainbow Connection” – string arranger/violin
Dixie Chicks Top Of The World – string arranger/leader/violin
Sheryl Crow C'mon, C'mon – string arrangements/conductor/violin
Dixie Chicks Home “Landslide” single – string arrangement/leader/violin
Sheryl Crow I Am Sam Soundtrack  “Mother Nature’s Son” – string arrangement/leader/violin
John Tesh One World PBS Special – violin/vocals

Discography 
 Christmas World! – Melodia Records 2014 
 Soul Shifter – Melodia Records 2010 
 The Song of Songs (w. Ben Zebelman) – Spring Hill Music 2002 
 The Instrumentals – Melodia Records 2002 
 Mystic Fiddler – Melodia Records 2001
 Imago – EMI/Angel Records 1997

Soundtrack Contributions 
Cool Women Warner Entertainment Beloved From Mystic Fiddler
Lani Loa Chrome Dragon Films Salvation From Imago
Swift Justice UPN The Road to Hasedera From Imago

References

External links

 
 Official YouTube Channel
 
 Lorenza Ponce on Instagram

1963 births
American women composers
21st-century American composers
American rock violinists
American rock musicians
American classical violinists
Living people
21st-century American women musicians
21st-century classical violinists
21st-century women composers
21st-century American violinists